Kahrizeh-ye Shakak (also Romanized as Kahrīzeh-ye Shakāk; also known as Kahrīzeh) is a village in Solduz Rural District, in the Central District of Naqadeh County, West Azerbaijan Province, Iran. At the 2006 census, its population was 150, in 36 families.

References 

Populated places in Naqadeh County